Sparaxis metelerkampiae,  is a species of Sparaxis found in Western Cape, South Africa.

References

External links
 
 

metelerkampiae
Taxa named by Louisa Bolus
Taxa named by Peter Goldblatt
Taxa named by John Charles Manning